Iraj is a given name.

Iraj may also refer to:
 Iraj, East Azerbaijan
 Iraj, Isfahan
 Iraj, North Khorasan